The Atlantic sixgill shark (Hexanchus vitulus) is a rare species of hexanchid shark found in the Atlantic Ocean at depths that are greater than 300 meters. These depths are known as mesopelagic and bathypelagic in tropical and temperate waters around the world. The Atlantic sixgill shark is very similar to other species of sixgill in terms of its growth rate in deep sea waters. It is believed that this is due to the abiotic and biotic factors in relation to the depths at which they are found. It was formerly described as its own species, but was synonymised with the bigeye sixgill shark (Hexanchus nakamurai). However, a study published in 2019 resurrected the species on the basis of molecular data. The species can be physically differentiated from the bluntnose sixgill shark (Hexanchus griseus) by its much smaller size and position of the dorsal fin in relation to the caudal fin.
The Atlantic sixgill shark (Hexanchus vitulus) becomes sexually mature at around 1.40 to 1.75 meters. They do not reach lengths much greater than 180 cm. 

Although the Atlantic sixgill shark was believed to be the only species in its genus it has been discovered that there are two more species that share the genus with it. The Bigeye sixgill shark (Hexanchus nakamurai) and the Bluntnose sixgill shark (Hexanchus griseus) are also related with the Atlantic sixgill shark. 

An experiment shows that the Atlantic sixgill shark will not a prey after it has been dead for 24 hours, it will ignore said prey and move on to its next kill. They will also fed more on the prey in the spring season as compared to the winter season.

References 

Hexanchus
Fish described in 1969